Xiyang Township:

Xiyang Township (西杨乡) in Wafangdian, Liaoning
Xiyang Yi Ethnic Township (夕阳乡) in Yunnan